Qaleh-ye Sefid (also Romanized as Qal‘eh-ye Sefīd) is a village in Milanlu Rural District, in the Central District of Esfarayen County, North Khorasan Province, Iran. At the 2006 census, its population was 144, in 31 families.  The name means "white castle".

References 

Populated places in Esfarayen County